The War of Italian Independence, or Italian Wars of Independence, include:

First Italian War of Independence (1848–1849)
Second Italian War of Independence (1859)
Third Italian War of Independence (1866)
Fourth Italian War of Independence (1915–1918): alternative name of the Italian participation in the World War I.